Terrance James Arceneaux is an American college basketball player for Houston Cougars of the American Athletic Conference.

Early life and high school
Arceneaux grew up in Beaumont, Texas and attended Beaumont United High School. He averaged 20.9 points, 7.7 rebounds, and 4.0 blocks per game during his junior season as Beaumont United won the Class 5A state championship. Arceneaux averaged 15.1 points, 7.6 rebounds, 2.0 assists, 3.2 blocks, and 2.2 steals per game and Beaumont United repeated as state champions as a senior. He also played in the Iverson Classic during the season. Arcenaux was rated a four-star recruit and committed to play college basketball at Houston over offers from Oklahoma, Texas A&M, and UNLV.

College career
Arceneaux served as a key reserve during his freshman season at Houston. He was named to the American Athletic Conference (AAC) All-Freshman team at the end of the regular season. Arceneaux made his first career start in the 2023 American Athletic Conference tournament championship, replacing injured starter Marcus Sasser and scoring nine points in a 75–65 loss to Memphis.

References

External links
Houston Cougars bio

Living people
African-American basketball players
American men's basketball players
Basketball players from Texas
Houston Cougars men's basketball players
Shooting guards